A Pretzel knot may refer to:

 Pretzel link: a concept in mathematics
 Soft pretzel with garlic
 Stafford knot: a rope knot used in sailing and heraldry